The Calgary Dinos football team represents the University of Calgary in the sport of Canadian football in U Sports. The program has been in operation since 1964, winning the Vanier Cup national championship five times (1983, 1985, 1988, 1995, 2019), the most out of any of the Canada West teams. The Dinos have also won the Hardy Trophy conference championship 18 times, including six consecutive wins from 2008 to 2013. The team appeared in the 2013 and 2016 Vanier Cup, but lost both years to the Laval Rouge et Or.

Recent regular season results

National award winners
Hec Crighton Trophy: Greg Vavra (1983), Don Blair (1995), Erik Glavic (2009), Andrew Buckley (2014, 2015), Adam Sinagra (2018)
J. P. Metras Trophy: Scott McArthur (1980), Chris Konrad (1992), Garret Everson (1998)
Presidents' Trophy: Darcy Kopp (1985)
Peter Gorman Trophy: Dalin Tollestrup (2006), Linden Gaydosh (2009), Eric Dzwilewski (2010), Tyson Philpot (2018)
Russ Jackson Award: Elio Geremia (1987), Lincoln Blumell (2002), Andrew Buckley (2013, 2014)
Lieutenant Governor Athletic Award: Don Blair (1996), Erik Glavic (2010), Andrew Buckley (2016)
Frank Tindall Trophy: Peter Connellan (1977, 1985), Wayne Harris, Jr. (2015)

Calgary Dinos in the CFL
As of the end of the 2022 CFL season, 24 former Dinos players were on CFL teams' rosters:
Treshaun Abrahams-Webster, Montreal Alouettes
Jeshrun Antwi, Montreal Alouettes
Logan Bandy, Saskatchewan Roughriders
Elie Bouka, Calgary Stampeders
Sukh Chungh, BC Lions
Darius Ciraco, Ottawa Redblacks
Tanner Doll, BC Lions
Mike Edem, Saskatchewan Roughriders
Jake Harty, Saskatchewan Roughriders
Adam Konar, Edmonton Elks
Grant McDonald, Hamilton Tiger-Cats
Sean McEwen, Calgary StampedersCharlie Moore, Calgary Stampeders
Peter Nicastro, Toronto Argonauts
Tyler Packer, BC Lions
J-Min Pelley, Edmonton Elks
Jalen Philpot, Calgary Stampeders
Tyson Philpot, Montreal Alouettes
Jacob Plamondon, Edmonton Elks
Ryan Sceviour, Calgary Stampeders
Rashaun Simonise, Edmonton Elks
Richard Sindani, Calgary Stampeders
Nick Statz, Calgary Stampeders
Micah Teitz, Saskatchewan Roughriders

References

External links
 

 
Sports clubs established in 1964
1964 establishments in Alberta